Royal Air Force Toome or more simply RAF Toome is a former Royal Air Force satellite station located in Toome, County Antrim, Northern Ireland.

History

The following units were here at some point:
 Relief Landing Ground of No. 2 Flying Training School RAF (February 1953 - ?)
 'A' Flight of No. 104 (Transport) Operational Training Unit RAF (July - September 1943)
 No. 203 Gliding School RAF (July 1953 - April 1955)
 Mobile Transport Servicing Unit of No. 217 Maintenance Unit RAF (October 1945 - February 1946)
 No. 257 Maintenance Unit RAF (June 1945 - March 1947)

References

Citations

Bibliography

Toome